Amber is one of the 200 Legislative Assembly constituencies of Rajasthan state in India. It is in Jaipur district and is one of the eight assembly segments of Jaipur Rural (Lok Sabha constituency).

Members of Assembly
 1951: Two MLAs were elected from this seat in the very first election.  
 1951: Maha Rawal Sangram Singh, Independent
 1951: Kuwar Tej Singh, Ram Rajya Parishad
 1952 bypoll: Angad Ram, Indian National Congress
 1952 bypoll: Kamala Kumari, Indian National Congress
 1957: Hari Shankar S. Shastri, Indian National Congress
 1957: Sahdeo, Indian National Congress
 1962: Man Singh, Swatantra Party
 1967: Sahdeo, Swatantra Party
 1972: Shakuntla, Indian National Congress
 1977: Pushpa, Janata Party
 1980: Pushpa, Bharatiya Janata Party
 1985: Bhairon Singh Shekhawat, (BJP). Resigned from here, as he had also won from Nimbahera. 
 1985 bypoll: R.P.Katariya, Indian National Congress
 1990: Gopi Ram, Bharatiya Janata Party 
 1993: Gopi Ram, Bharatiya Janata Party 
 1998: Sahadev Sharma, Indian National Congress
 2003: Lal Chand Kataria, Indian National Congress
 2008: Ganga Sahay Sharma, Indian National Congress
 2013: Naveen Pilania, National People's Party

Election Results

1951 Vidhan Sabha
 Kr. Tej Singh (RRP) : 10,666 votes. For one of the two members to be elected from Amber.
 (Losing candidate) Ram Niwas (INC) : 9,202

1985 Vidhan Sabha
 Bhairon Singh Shekhawat (BJP) : 42,674 votes 
 Tara Chand Chandel (INC) : 28,036

1985 Bypoll
 R.P.Katariya (INC) : 30,334 votes
 G.Ram (BJP) : 27,949

2018

See also
List of constituencies of the Rajasthan Legislative Assembly
Jaipur district

References

Jaipur district
Assembly constituencies of Rajasthan